"Honky Tonk Heart" is a song written by Russell Smith and Jim Photoglo, and recorded by American country music group Highway 101.  It was released in May 1989 as the fourth single from their album 101². The song reached #6 on the Billboard Hot Country Singles chart in September 1989.

Chart performance

Year-end charts

References

1989 singles
Highway 101 songs
Songs written by Russell Smith (singer)
Song recordings produced by Paul Worley
Warner Records singles
Songs written by Jim Photoglo
1988 songs